Athletes from the United Kingdom of Great Britain and Ireland competed at the 1906 Intercalated Games in Athens, Greece. 47 athletes, all men, competed in 42 events in 9 sports.

Athletics

Track

Field

Cycling

Diving

Fencing

Football

Although Great Britain didn't send a team, eight British players (all from the same family) represented Smyrna from the Ottoman Empire, they lost their first match 0–5 against Denmark, but then won the silver medal match against one of the Greek sides after the original Greek side defaulted during the final.
The eight British silver medal winners were:

 Edward Charnaud 
 Zareh Couyoumdjian
 Percy La Fontaine
 Albert Whittall
 Donald Whittall 
 Edward Whittall
 Godfrey Whittall
 Herbert Whittall

Gymnastics

Rowing

The only British rower was Donald Whittall who competed for a mixed team in the coxed fours.

Shooting

Swimming

References

Nations at the 1906 Intercalated Games
1906
Intercalated Games
Intercalated Games